Abdullah Dukuly (also known as Abdulai Dukuly and Abdoulaye W. Dukule) is a Liberian journalist and news editor, formerly of The News, a Monrovia-based daily publication.

Arrest
Dukuly was arrested along with fellow editors Joseph Bartuah, Jerome Dalieh, and journalist Bobby Tapson on 21 February 2001 after The News reported the government of Charles Taylor paid 50,000 United States dollars to fix helicopters rather than pay civil servants.

References

External links
 Abdoulaye W. Dukule, "Men and Women of the Liberian Press: War Heroes", The Perspective, 30 July 2002
 "UN Seeks to Transform Liberia from Failed State to Nation at Peace", Inter Press Service News Agency, 6 October 2003
 by Abdullah Dukuly, "LIBERIA: Before UN Sanctions Are Lifted, a Timber Industry Clean-Up", Inter Press Service News Agency, 31 March 2006

Year of birth missing (living people)
Living people
Liberian journalists
People from Monrovia